Dean Anthony Walling (born 17 April 1969) is a former professional footballer. Although he started his career as a forward, he predominantly played as a centre-back. Born in Leeds, England, to parents from Saint Kitts, he played for the Saint Kitts and Nevis national team.

He was a key player in Carlisle's Third Division win in 1995, and helped the to a promotion from the same division in 1997. He was also one of Carlisle's scorer's in the 1997 EFL Trophy Final at Wembley Stadium, which Carlisle won on penalties after a 0–0 draw after 120 minutes.

He now runs a soccer club in Lincoln, coaching young players.

Honours
Carlisle United
Football League Third Division: 1994–95
EFL Trophy: 1996–97

Individual
PFA Team of the Year: 1994–95 Third Division, 1996–97 Third Division, 1997–98 Third Division

References

External links

 CSL stats

1969 births
Living people
English sportspeople of Saint Kitts and Nevis descent
Saint Kitts and Nevis footballers
Footballers from Leeds
Association football defenders
Saint Kitts and Nevis international footballers
English Football League players
Canadian Soccer League (1987–1992) players
Rochdale A.F.C. players
Carlisle United F.C. players
Lincoln City F.C. players
Doncaster Rovers F.C. players
Northwich Victoria F.C. players
Cambridge United F.C. players
Nuneaton Borough F.C. players
Gainsborough Trinity F.C. players
Kitchener Spirit players
Saint Kitts and Nevis expatriate footballers
English expatriate footballers
English expatriate sportspeople in Canada
Expatriate soccer players in Canada